Spoilers of the West is a 1927 American silent Western film directed by W. S. Van Dyke, written by Joseph Farnham, Madeleine Ruthven, and Ross B. Wills, and starring Tim McCoy, Marjorie Daw, William Fairbanks, Charles Thurston and Chief John Big Tree. It was released on December 10, 1927, by Metro-Goldwyn-Mayer.

Cast 
 Tim McCoy as Lieutenant Lang
 Marjorie Daw as Miss Benton
 William Fairbanks as Benton
 Charles Thurston as General Sherman
 Chief John Big Tree as Red Cloud

References

External links 
 

1927 films
1927 Western (genre) films
Metro-Goldwyn-Mayer films
Films directed by W. S. Van Dyke
American black-and-white films
Silent American Western (genre) films
1920s English-language films
1920s American films